Brandon James Hackenberg (born July 2, 1999) is an American professional soccer player who plays as a defender for Orlando City B in MLS Next Pro.

Early years 
Hackenberg prepped at Fluvanna County High School but elected not to play high school soccer, instead choosing to concentrate on his club team. He played four seasons with Richmond United.

Penn State Nittany Lions 
Hackenberg played college soccer at Pennsylvania State University for the Nittany Lions between 2016 and 2021. He played 22 minutes in his collegiate debut against Oakland on September 5, 2016, as a true freshman before redshirting the rest of the season. The following year he made nine appearances including three starts. In 2018, Hackenberg's role increased as he appeared in all 17 of Penn State's matches as a redshirt sophomore including 15 starts. He was a key member of a defense that recorded six clean sheets. During the season he scored his first goal for the Nittany Lions in a 2–0 victory over Detroit Mercy on October 17, 2018. In 2019, Hackenberg appeared in 18 of a possible 19 matches. The only game his missed during the final four years of his collegiate career was against Northwestern on October 12 due to suspension having received a red card the previous game against Indiana. He earned first-team All-Big Ten honors for the first time as Penn State finished second in regular season play and returned to the NCAA Tournament for the first time in five years. After being selected in the 2021 MLS SuperDraft, Hackenberg returned for his redshirt senior season following the postponement of the 2020 fall season until spring 2021 due to the COVID-19 pandemic. He was named captain and the led the team in minutes played, playing every minute in all 13 matches during the shortened season. He was named first-team All-Big Ten for a second time and also earned United Soccer Coaches first-team All-North Region honors. With the NCAA granting an extra year of eligibility due to the shortened nature of the pandemic season, Hackenberg returned for a sixth season in 2021. He started all 21 matches as Penn State claimed the Big Ten regular season title for the first time since 2013 before also winning the Big Ten Tournament for the first time since 2005. For a third consecutive season he was named first-team All-Big Ten.

While at college, Hackenberg played for USL League Two side Reading United in 2019, appearing eight times as the team finished top of the Mid Atlantic Division and made it all the way to the National Championship before losing out to Flint City Bucks.

Club career

Orlando City B 
On January 21, 2021, Hackenberg was selected in the first round (22nd overall) of the 2021 MLS SuperDraft by Orlando City. Having returned to Penn State to exhaust his remaining NCAA eligibility during the 2021 season, Hackenberg signed with the team's reserve affiliate, Orlando City B, in MLS Next Pro ahead of 2022 season. He made his professional debut on March 26 in the season opener.

On May 7, 2022, Hackenberg was loaned up to Orlando City first team on a short-term contract for an MLS game against CF Montréal and the team's U.S. Open Cup fourth round game against Philadelphia Union.

Personal life 
Hackenberg grew up in a sporting family. His father, Erick, was a star high school quarterback at Marian Catholic, later playing football at Virginia and Susquehanna. His mother, Nikki, played volleyball collegiality at Lehigh. Hackenberg is the second of four brothers: older brother, Christian, also attended Penn State and was selected in the second round of the 2016 NFL Draft by the New York Jets. He attempted to make the switch to professional baseball in 2020; younger brother, Adam, played baseball at Clemson and was selected in the 18th round of the 2021 Major League Baseball draft by the Chicago White Sox; youngest brother, Drue, plays baseball at Virginia Tech.

Career statistics

College

Club

Honors 
Penn State
Big Ten Conference regular season: 2021
Big Ten Tournament: 2021

References

External links 
 Brandon Hackenberg at Penn State Nittany Lions
 

1999 births
Living people
People from Carbon County, Pennsylvania
Soccer players from Pennsylvania
American soccer players
Association football defenders
Penn State Nittany Lions men's soccer players
Orlando City SC draft picks
Orlando City B players
Reading United A.C. players
USL League Two players
MLS Next Pro players
Orlando City SC players